Lake Gordon is a man-made reservoir created by the Gordon Dam, located on the upper reaches of the Gordon River in the south-west region of Tasmania, Australia.

Features
The reservoir was formed in the early 1970s as a result of the dam construction by the Hydro-Electricity Commission of Tasmania in order to create an upper storage for the Gordon Power Station, the largest and most controversial hydro-electric power scheme in Tasmania.

Controversy
Additional dams were proposed for the lower Gordon River, however they were subject to political protest led by The Wilderness Society, most notably the Franklin Dam controversy during the early 1980s. In 1983 the Hawke-led Australian Government intervened and overturned a decision by the Tasmanian Government to dam the lower Gordon. When the Tasmanian Government refused to halt work in the UNESCO-listed World Heritage Area, the Australian Government successfully sought a ruling in the High Court of Australia in Commonwealth v Tasmania. The lower Gordon was not dammed.

Tasmanian Energy Crisis
In early 2016, the lowest ever water supply levels in the lake were recorded during the 2016 Tasmanian energy crisis.

See also

List of reservoirs and dams in Tasmania
List of lakes in Tasmania

References 

Gordon
Gordon River, Tasmania
2016 Tasmanian energy crisis
Gordon River power development scheme
Reservoirs in Tasmania

...